Richard Brickhouse (born October 27, 1939 in Rocky Point, North Carolina) is a retired NASCAR driver. He is best known for winning the inaugural Talladega 500 in 1969 after a boycott of the top stars of the sport at the time because concerns with tire wear with the high rate of speeds at the racetrack. Though Brickhouse ran his final race in 1982, he did attempt a comeback in 1995 at age 55 at Rockingham driving for former driver Dick Skillen. The comeback was cut short, as Brickhouse crashed his No. 14 Chevy in qualifying. Brickhouse concluded his career with one win, four top fives and 13 career top 10s in 39 races. He held the Guinness book of world records for fastest time on a closed circuit for many years.

References

1939 births
Living people
NASCAR drivers
People from Pender County, North Carolina
Racing drivers from North Carolina